Opuwo Airport  is an airport serving Opuwo, Namibia.

See also

List of airports in Namibia
Transport in Namibia

References

External links
 OurAirports - FYOP
 OpenStreetMap - Opuwo
 Google Earth

Airports in Namibia